East Troy Municipal Airport  is a village owned public use airport located 2 miles (3 km) northeast of the central business district of East Troy, Wisconsin, a village in Walworth County, Wisconsin, United States. It is included in the Federal Aviation Administration (FAA) National Plan of Integrated Airport Systems for 2021–2025, in which it is categorized as a local general aviation facility.

Although most airports in the United States use the same three-letter location identifier for the FAA and International Air Transport Association (IATA), this airport is assigned 57C by the FAA but has no designation from the IATA.

Facilities and aircraft 
East Troy Municipal Airport covers an area of 214 acres (86 ha) at an elevation of 860 feet (262 m) above mean sea level. It has two runways: 8/26 is 3,900 by 75 feet (1,189 x 23 m) with an asphalt surface and 18/36 is 2,446 by 75 feet (746 x 23 m) with a turf surface.

For the 12-month period ending May 5, 2021, the airport had 41,000 aircraft operations, an average of 112 per day: 98% general aviation, 2% air taxi and less than 1% military.
In January 2023, there were 62 aircraft based at this airport: 52 single-engine, 3 multi-engine, 1 jet and 6 helicopter.

See also
List of airports in Wisconsin

References

External links 
 Airport Page at Village of East Troy website
 

Airports in Wisconsin
Airports in Walworth County, Wisconsin